Leawood Gardens is a small suburb of Adelaide, South Australia in both the City of Mitcham and the City of Burnside located in the foothills of the Adelaide Hills. It is crossed by both the South Eastern Freeway and Mount Barker Road uphill from the "Devil's Elbow" intersection, and contains the northern portal of the Heysen Tunnels.

References

Suburbs of Adelaide